Gustavus Augustus Northcott (April 4, 1861 – December 8, 1938) was the Republican President of the West Virginia Senate from Cabell County and served from 1905 to 1907. He was the brother of Elliott Northcott, a federal judge.

References

Presidents of the West Virginia State Senate
West Virginia state senators
1861 births
1938 deaths